James Wilfred Stevenson Thomson (29 October 1908 – 28 June 1985) was a Scottish-American professional golfer, who is notable for losing the 1936 PGA Championship to Denny Shute, 3&2.

Thomson was born in North Berwick, the son of pro golfer Wilfred Thomson. His cousin Jack White won the 1904 Open Championship. In 1921 his father Wilfred was appointed pro at The Country Club of Virginia. The following year, Jimmy sailed to the U.S. with his mother and sister Emily.

Thomson appeared in the movie The Caddy with Jerry Lewis and Dean Martin. He also featured in Shoot Yourself Some Golf with Ronald Reagan and Jane Wyman. He was married to silent film star Viola Dana from 1930 to 1945.

Professional wins

PGA Tour wins
1936 Richmond Open
1938 Los Angeles Open

Other wins
this list may be incomplete
1927 Virginia Open
1934 Melbourne Centenary Open (Australia)
1937 San Francisco Matchplay Open

Results in major championships

NYF = tournament not yet founded
NT = no tournament
WD = withdrew
CUT = missed the half-way cut
R64, R32, R16, QF, SF = round in which player lost in PGA Championship match play
"T" indicates a tie for a place

Summary

Most consecutive cuts made – 16 (1934 U.S. Open – 1940 Masters)
Longest streak of top-10s – 2 (three times)

References

External links
 North Berwick profile

Scottish male golfers
American male golfers
PGA Tour golfers
1908 births
1985 deaths